Özgür Öçal (born 5 October 1981) is a Turkish professional footballer who last played as a midfielder for Adanaspor.

References

External links
 
 

1981 births
Living people
Turkish footballers
Bakırköyspor footballers
Galatasaray S.K. footballers
Kasımpaşa S.K. footballers
Eskişehirspor footballers
Süper Lig players
TFF First League players
Association football midfielders
Association football defenders